Singapore Island or Pulau Ujong, is the main constituent island of the sovereign island country and city-state of the Republic of Singapore. It is located at the southern tip of Malay Peninsula, in-between the Straits of Malacca and the South China Sea. The Singapore Strait lies to the south, while the Johor Strait lies to the north.

The island forms the bulk of the country in terms of area, population and prominence, since areas situated on the country's smaller islands consists of military or industrial areas, with the exceptions being Sentosa as well as Ubin Island.

Etymology
Temasek was the early recorded name of a settlement on the site of today's Singapore, although the island itself wasn't specifically defined. Meanwhile, Pulau Ujong was the one of the earliest references to Singapore Island. The 3rd-century Chinese reference to Pú Luó Zhōng, corresponds to the local reference known as Pulau Ujong, which directly translates to English as the "Island at the end". 

Travellers and merchants from around Asia arriving at the Singapore Strait to the South China Sea would have to pass by the island, hence the name Pulau Ujong. At the time, the island was also used by the Orang Laut to mean the "End Island". Ujong Tanah or "Land at the Furthest" or its variants were also used in European sources as a name for Singapore.

Legend
According to a mythical third-century book Record of Foreign countries during the Eastern Wu Period (呉時外國傳), the island was inhabited by cannibals with five to six-inch tails.

Geography

The highest point of Singapore is Bukit Timah Hill, with a height of 163.63m (536.8ft) and made up of igneous rock, granite. Hills and valleys of sedimentary rock dominate the northwest, while the eastern region consists of sandy and flatter land. 

Since 1822, there were land reclamation works by the British, who at that time controlled the island as a colony. A further  of land is also expected to be added to the main island.

Extreme points

The northernmost end of the island is Sembawang. The westernmost and southernmost points are at Tuas. The easternmost point of the island is Changi Bay.

References
Citations

Bibliography

Further reading

Ujong, Pulau
Islands of the South China Sea